is a Japanese slice of life romance shōjo manga series written and illustrated by Chieko Hosokawa. It was serialized in Kodansha's Bessatsu Friend manga magazine and a total of five volumes were published. A 24-episode live action television drama series adaptation, was broadcast on Fuji Television from April 23 to October 15, 1986.

Volumes
1 (May 12, 1970)
2 (May 25, 1970)
3 (July 12, 1970)
4 (August 8, 1970)
5 (August 8, 1970)

References

1970 manga
1970 comics endings
1986 Japanese television series debuts
1986 Japanese television series endings
Fuji TV dramas
Kodansha manga
Manga adapted into television series
Romance anime and manga
Shōjo manga
Slice of life anime and manga